32nd Garrison Division was formed in October 1969 from 1st Engineer District, Engineer Troops of Lanzhou Military Region.

The division was composed of 3 regiments. after December 1969 these regiments were renamed as:
1st Garrison Regiment;
2nd Garrison Regiment;
3rd Garrison Regiment.

The division was stationed in Jiuquan, Gansu, as the garrison unit of Dongfeng Space Center.

From late 1969 the division was transferred to newly reformed 19th Army Corps. In December the division was renamed as Garrison Division of Lanzhou Military Region().

In 1976 Artillery Regiment was activated.

From January 1981, the division was renamed as 1st Garrison Division of Lanzhou Military Region()(1st formation) following 2nd Garrison Division of Lanzhou Military Region's activation.

From November 1982, the division was renamed as 57th Army Division(). The division's unit code by then was Military Unit 84707.

The division was then composed of:
169th Infantry Regiment;
170th Infantry Regiment;
171st Infantry Regiment;
Artillery Regiment.

In September 1985, the division was disbanded along with the Army Corps.

References

057
Military units and formations established in 1969
Military units and formations disestablished in 1985